Bakhchisaray (Baqsaharay) is a rural locality (a village) in Ilchimbetovsky Selsoviet, Tuymazinsky District, Bashkortostan, Russia. The population was 8 as of 2010. There is 1 street.

Geography 
Bakhchisaray is located 13 km southwest of Tuymazy (the district's administrative centre) by road. Maxyutovo is the nearest rural locality.

References 

Rural localities in Tuymazinsky District